Buddhas barn (in English: Buddha's Children) is a 2003 Danish documentary film directed and written by Christina Rosendahl. The film is about the reincarnation of one of Dalai Lama's most important teacher, Khunu Lama. As a child of a Danish young hippie-woman and a Tibetan lama, he was born in the early 80's and was brought up in the famous Tibetan monastery in exile Mindroling.

The film was shot in color for the Danish public TV-channel DRTV and supported by the Danish Movie Institute (Filminstituttet) and first shown on 18 August 2003. Idea and consultation; Erik Meier Carlsen, Danish journalist and writer.

External links

2003 films
2000s Danish-language films
Danish documentary films
Danish black-and-white films
2003 documentary films
Documentary films about Buddhism
Films directed by Christina Rosendahl